"Vois sur ton chemin" (in English, "Look to Your Path" or "See Upon Your Path")  is a song from the 2004 film Les Choristes. Text and music are by Bruno Coulais and Christophe Barratier. In the film, the song was performed by Jean-Baptiste Maunier from the choir Les Petits Chanteurs de Saint-Marc.

The song was performed by Beyoncé Knowles and the American Boychoir at the 2005 Academy Awards.

Vois Sur ton Chemin has appeared in other artists' work.  The fourth single from Christina Aguilera's Back to Basics album, "Oh Mother", contains samples from this song. DIVINEalso included samples of the movie version in his song "3:59 AM". Candan Erçetin recorded a Turkish version, "Sevdim Anladım", with the Kuştepe Çocuk Korosu choir in her Remix'5 album.

References

Songs written for films
French songs
French-language songs
2004 songs
Beyoncé songs